Astah, formerly known as JUDE (Java and UML Developers' Environment, pronounced ), is a UML modeling tool created by Japanese company Change Vision. JUDE received the "Software Product Of The Year 2006" prize, established by Information-Technology Promotion Agency in Japan.

Versions

JUDE/Community
The Community edition (formerly known as  edition for prior to version 1.4) is free to use and offers the following functionality:
Support of UML 1.4 (part of UML 2.0 expression in commercial version JUDE/Professional)
Class diagram (Object, Package, Subsystem and Robustness Diagrams are included)
Use case diagram
Sequence diagram
Collaboration Diagram
State diagram
Activity diagram
Deployment diagram
Component diagram
Generate Java 1.4 sourcecode from model
Import Java 1.4 source files to create model

JUDE/Professional
JUDE/Professional is the product version of JUDE with all the features of JUDE/Community plus enhancements. It has features such as input-output and diagram creation guidance. It is suitable for business use, large-sized models, and document creation.
A 20-day free trial is available by obtaining an Evaluation License.
Merge JUDE Projects
UseCase Descriptions
UseCase Description Templates
Process Diagram
Model Input-Output function from/to XML
Mindmaps
ER diagram

JUDE/Professional began to support the part of diagrams' expressions of UML2.0 from version 3.0.
Frame
Navigable Association (Class Diagram, UseCase Diagram, Deployment Diagram)
Required Interface (Class Diagram) (from version 3.1)
Provided Interface (Class Diagram) 
CombinedFragment (Sequence Diagram)
InteractionUse (Sequence Diagram)
FoundMessage (Sequence Diagram)
LostMessage (Sequence Diagram)
StateInvariant (Sequence Diagram)
Vertical and Horizontal Partitions (Activity Diagram)
Component Diagram (from version 3.1)
Composite Structure Diagram (from version 3.1)

JUDE/Professional supports also ER diagram from version 3.2.

History 
JUDE development was started by Kenji Hiranabe, CEO of Change Vision, Inc., in 1996.

JUDE was provided as a free software in 1999. Five years later JUDE started selling in the Japanese market. This decision came about because some UML modeling tools existed overseas but they were a bit high priced; and the company would get feedback from Japanese users and could evolve more if JUDE was released on the market.

The number of JUDE users was 120,000 as of October 30, 2006. In September 2009, JUDE was renamed to Astah after receiving concerns from German users who pointed out the product name was similar to the German word Jude, which refers to a male Jew.

See also
UML
List of UML tools
List of SysML tools

References

UML tools
Java development tools